David Aaron Binn (born February 6, 1972) is a former American football long snapper who played in the National Football League (NFL) for eighteen seasons.  He played college football for the University of California, Berkeley.  He was signed by the San Diego Chargers as an undrafted free agent in 1994. He was the last remaining active member of the Chargers' Super Bowl XXIX team, as well as their infamous 2000 season, where they went 1–15.

Early years
Binn, who is Jewish as is his father, attended San Mateo High School in San Mateo, California, and was a letterwinner in football, basketball, and golf. In football, he was a two-time All-Peninsula Athletic League honoree. He then played college football as a linebacker and long snapper for the University of California, Berkeley.

College career
Binn attended the University of California at Berkeley, where he played in 42 games as a long snapper. He earned a BA degree in Ecology and Interdisciplinary Studies in 1995.

Professional career
Binn surpassed Junior Seau and Russ Washington with his 201st career game played as a Charger on November 19, 2006 making him the all-time leader.  He was selected for the first time to the 2007 Pro Bowl squad, making him the eleventh selection from the 2006 Chargers chosen to represent the AFC in Hawaii. Binn suffered a hamstring injury in Week 1 of 2010 that ended his team-record streak of 179 consecutive games played.

After 17 seasons in San Diego, he was released on August 30, 2011. He was Chargers' all-time leader in games played with 256, not including 12 in the post-season.

On January 13, 2012, Binn signed with the Denver Broncos, one day before their playoff game against the New England Patriots.

Personal life
Binn dated Pamela Anderson in 2007 and 2008.

See also
List of select Jewish football players

References

1972 births
Living people
American Conference Pro Bowl players
American football long snappers
Jewish American sportspeople
California Golden Bears football players
San Diego Chargers players
Sportspeople from the San Francisco Bay Area
Players of American football from California
People from San Mateo, California
21st-century American Jews